Irina Rimes (born Irina Rîmeș on ), is a Moldovan-Romanian singer-songwriter who established herself as one of the leading music artists in Romania and Moldova since the late 2010s. She is one of the four coaches of the Romanian talent show Vocea României. Rimes works and lives in Bucharest, Chișinău, and Paris.

In 2019, Rimes was chosen by Warner Bros Animation to provide the Romanian voice of Whatevra Wanabi in the animated movie The Lego Movie 2. Besides her native Romanian, she speaks in Russian, English and French.

Life and career

1991–2015: Childhood and beginnings in music 
Irina was born on 22 August 1991 in the Florești District and is the first child of Valentina and Fiodor Rîmeș; she has a younger brother, Vitali. Irina has stated in interviews that her family nourished her interest for music, especially her father and paternal grandmother, the latter of which had a very good voice, according to Irina — "grandma used to be a part of a church choir and I remember how she would sit on the stove and sing carols to us". Rimes manifested an interest towards writing and composing from an early age: "I started writing poetry when I was in grade 0. I remember that I learned to sing, write and read at home." The artist moved to Soroca when she started studying at the "Constantin Stere" Theoretical High School until 2010; she later graduated from the Academy of Music, Theater and Plastic Arts in Chișinău. In 2012, Irina Rimes participated in the talent show Fabrica de staruri, where she was a finalist.

2016–present: "Visele" and Despre el 
Rimes moved to Romania in 2016, when she signed with Quantum Music. Her first single, "Visele" (The dreams), peaked at #1 in Romania Airplay 100 in 2016 and got her an award for the best début of the year at the Radio România Music Awards in 2017. Rimes has also penned songs for various Romanian artists, such as Inna, Raluka, Andra, Alina Eremia, Nicoleta Nucă and Antonia. The Romanian branch of Cosmopolitan named her "the revelation of 2016". In 2017, Rimes signed a contract with Universal Music France and released her first album, Despre el (About him). In 2018, she became one of the four coaches of Vocea României. 
In 2019, Irina Rimes gave an exclusive interview about her career to Turkey's biggest digital music magazine ÖMC Dergi (Dergi), became the cover star of a magazine for the first time in Turkey.

Discography

Albums 
 Despre el (2017)
 Cosmos (2018)
 Pastila (2020)
 Acasă (2022)

Singles

As lead artist

Promotional singles

As a featured artist

As a songwriter for other artists

References

1991 births
Living people
21st-century Moldovan women singers
People from Florești District
Global Records artists